Spirituals is an album by David Murray released on the Japanese DIW label in 1988. It features seven quartet performances by Murray with Fred Hopkins, Dave Burrell and Ralph Peterson Jr.

Reception
The Allmusic review by Scott Yanow awarded the album 3 stars stating "David Murray mostly sticks to spirituals on this Japanese import, a quartet outing with pianist Dave Burrell, bassist Fred Hopkins and drummer Ralph Peterson, but that does not mean that all of the improvising is mellow and melodic. There are some peaceful moments on tunes such as "Amazing Grace" and a spirited "Down by the Riverside," but Murray's playing is so violent on "Abel's Blissed Out Blues" as to be almost satirical. A mixed success from the masterful tenor.".

Track listing
All compositions by David Murray except as indicated

 "Amazing Grace" (Newton) – 5:43  
 "Dave Blue" (Burrell)  7:50  
 "Blues for My Sisters (For Barbara and Michelle)" – 8:15  
 "Nobody Knows the Trouble I've Seen/Down by the Riverside" (Traditional) – 4:24  
 "Sunlit on a Dark Afternoon" – 6:30  
 "Crucifixion" (Traditional) – 5:23  
 "Abel's Blissed Out Blues" (Burrell) – 10:27

Personnel
David Murray – tenor saxophone
Dave Burrell – piano
Fred Hopkins – bass
Ralph Peterson Jr. – drums

References 

1988 albums
David Murray (saxophonist) albums
DIW Records albums